John Schepers (27 February 1943) is a Canadian former soccer player. He was a national champion with Winnipeg AN&AF Scottish (1962) and a three-time Western Canada Soccer League winner with Regina Concordia (1963, 1964) and Calgary Buffalo Kickers (1968).

At the international level, Schepers first represented Canada in 1960 on a tour of the Soviet Union and Britain. In 1971, he made 10 international "B" appearances with Canada's Olympic team in Olympic Qualifiers and the 1971 Pan American Games in Colombia.

As a teenager in 1962, he scored four goals in the Canada Soccer Championship final as Winnipeg AN&AF Scottish won 6–0 over Edmonton Edelweiss.

Personal life
While Schepers was born in Netherlands, he was just 10 years old when his family moved to Winnipeg, Manitoba. He was just 15 years old when he started playing senior soccer in Winnipeg. He worked as a teacher and vice-principal in Regina for 30 years.

References

External links
 / Canada Soccer Hall of Fame
John Schepers NASL stats

1943 births
People from Tiel
Canadian soccer players
Dutch emigrants to Canada
Living people
Association football forwards
Soccer people from Manitoba
Pan American Games competitors for Canada
Footballers at the 1971 Pan American Games
Toronto Blizzard (1971–1984) players
North American Soccer League (1968–1984) players
Footballers from Gelderland